The Gordons is an album by New Zealand band The Gordons released in 1981.

Track listing
Side A
Spik And Span
Right On Time    
Coalminers Song    
Side B
Sometimes    
I Just Can't Stop    
Growing Up    
Laughing Now

Personnel
Brent McLaughlin (drums)
Alister Parker (guitar, vocals)
John Halvorsen (guitar, vocals)

References

Dunedin Sound albums
1981 albums